The 2017 Philippine Basketball Association (PBA) Governors' Cup Finals was the best-of-7 championship series of the 2017 PBA Governors' Cup, and the conclusion of the conference's playoffs. The Barangay Ginebra San Miguel and the Meralco Bolts competed for the 17th Governors' Cup championship and the 121st overall championship contested by the league. It was the rematch of the previous year's Governors' Cup finals.

Barangay Ginebra San Miguel won the series, four games to three, successfully defending the Governors' Cup championship. This is the second Governors' Cup and 10th overall championship of the Ginebra franchise.

Background

Road to the finals

Head-to-head matchup

Series summary

Game 1

Game 2

Game 3

Game 4

Game 5

Game 6

Game 7

Rosters

{| class="toccolours" style="font-size: 95%; width: 100%;"
|-
! colspan="2" style="background-color: #; color: #; text-align: center;" | Barangay Ginebra San Miguel 2017 PBA Governors' Cup roster
|- style="background-color:#; color: #; text-align: center;"
! Players !! Coaches
|-
| valign="top" |
{| class="sortable" style="background:transparent; margin:0px; width:100%;"
! Pos. !! # !! POB !! Name !! Height !! Weight !! !! College 
|-

  Chua also serves as Barangay Ginebra's board governor.

{| class="toccolours" style="font-size: 95%; width: 100%;"
|-
! colspan="2" style="background-color: #; color: #; text-align: center;" | Meralco Bolts 2017 PBA Governors' Cup roster
|- style="background-color:#; color: #; text-align: center;"
! Players !! Coaches
|-
| valign="top" |
{| class="sortable" style="background:transparent; margin:0px; width:100%;"
! Pos. !! # !! POB !! Name !! Height !! Weight !! !! College 
|-

Broadcast notes
The Governors' Cup Finals aired on TV5 with simulcasts on PBA Rush (both in standard and high definition). TV5's radio arm, Radyo5 provided the radio play-by-play coverage. 

ESPN5 also provided online livestreaming via their official YouTube account using the TV5 feed.

The PBA Rush broadcast provided English-language coverage of the Finals.

Additional Game 7 crew:
Trophy presentation: Magoo Marjon
Dugout celebration interviewer: Jutt Sulit

References

External links
PBA official website

2017
2016–17 PBA season
Barangay Ginebra San Miguel games
Meralco Bolts games
PBA Governors' Cup Finals
PBA Governors' Cup Finals 2017
PBA Governors' Cup Finals 2017